Oluf Christian Dietrichson (3 May 1856 – 20 February 1942) was a  Norwegian explorer and military officer. He was a member of the  Greenland expedition of 1888 led by Fridtjof Nansen, the first documented crossing of Greenland.

Oluf Dietrichson was born at Skogn  (now Levanger) in Nord-Trøndelag, Norway.  His father, Peter Wilhelm Kreidahl Dietrichson, was employed as the  senior doctor at the Nord-Trøndelag Hospital.  He received a military education and was commanding officer in Kristiansand from 1918 to 1924. Dietrichson continued his military career and advanced to Major General.

In 1888, Fridtjof Nansen assembling a team for the purpose of crossing the Greenlandic ice-sheet.  Dietrichson participated as a metrological surveyor, surveyor and map marker. The other participants at the Greenland expedition were Otto Sverdrup, Samuel Balto, Ole Nielsen Ravna and Kristian Kristiansen.

References

Other sources
 

1856 births
1942 deaths
People from Levanger
Norwegian Army generals
Norwegian polar explorers